Psychonauts in the Rhombus of Ruin is a first-person virtual reality adventure game developed by Double Fine Productions on the PlayStation 4 and Microsoft Windows for the HTC Vive and Oculus Rift. Released in 2017 on PS4 and on PC the following year, the game's story bridges the events between Psychonauts and Psychonauts 2.

Gameplay
Unlike the original Psychonauts, Psychonauts in the Rhombus of Ruin is not a 3D platformer, but instead a first-person puzzle-focused game similar to a point-and-click adventure. As Raz, the player always remains in a seated position, and may interact with characters and objects in the world using his psychic powers such as telekinesis and pyrokinesis. While many VR games have utilized a "blink teleportation" mechanic to allow players to travel in the virtual world, Psychonauts in the Rhombus of Ruin instead requires the player to use Raz's clairvoyance ability to see the world from the perspectives of the other characters in the scene (who also remain seated throughout). These mechanics are used to solve puzzles to gain information and trigger events which further the plot and advance the game.

Plot
The story picks up immediately after the ending of Psychonauts, with new Psychonaut cadet Razputin "Raz" Aquato joining fellow cadet Lili Zanotto and agents Sasha Nein, Milla Vodello, and Morceau Oleander in rescuing Lili's captured father Truman, the Grand Head of the Psychonauts. Using his Clairvoyance ability, Raz discovers Truman is being held at an abandoned Psychonaut research facility in an oceanic region known as the Rhombus of Ruin (a play on the Bermuda Triangle), built to study a large underwater deposit of Psilirium (a fictional element variant of Psitanium that can distort psychic powers and creates illusions). The team travels into the Rhombus of Ruin, but the jet crashes before they can act.

Raz awakens tied to a chair in the chamber Truman is being kept. Using his psychic abilities to explore the junk-filled ocean, Raz finds Sasha, Milla, Lili and Oleander trapped in Psilirium-induced hallucinations. After freeing his team from their hallucinations, Raz is pulled back into the chamber by Truman's kidnapper, the insane ex-dentist Dr. Loboto, who kidnapped Truman on the orders of a new client. By using a Psycho-Portal given to him by Oleander, Raz enters Loboto's mind. There, he fights a gigantic version of Loboto and enters his memories, where Raz learns Loboto was once a psychic himself, and his parents disapproved of his abilities and had him lobotomized. The process removed his psychic powers and drove Loboto insane, leading to his commitment at the Thorney Towers asylum.

After Raz exits Loboto's mind, Loboto seems to have a change of heart by releasing his team, but instead leaves Raz and the others and floods the base, which they barely escape from with Truman in tow. The game ends with the team flying back to their Motherlobe headquarters as Lili tells her father about their adventures, shocking him with the revelation that Raz is her boyfriend. Unbeknownst to the others, Loboto secretly hides himself in the jet's luggage compartment.

Development
The concept for Psychonauts in the Rhombus of Ruin came about during the lead-up to the crowd-sourcing campaign for Psychonauts 2. According to Double Fine's CEO, Tim Schafer, they were looking to see what types of games they could develop with a virtual reality (VR) system, comparing it to the games they had made for the Kinect system earlier. Due to their recent focus on Psychonauts, the team agreed that a VR-based Psychonauts game would be a good fit, allowing the player to become immersed in the odd environments within the Psychonauts universe.

The game was released on February 21, 2017 for PlayStation VR, after approximately a year and a half of development.

A year later, the game was released on PC on April 19, 2018 for the HTC Vive and Oculus Rift.

Reception
Psychonauts in the Rhombus of Ruin received average reviews from critics. Reviewers praised the unique gameplay mechanics and their integration into the story, as well as the continued expansion of the Psychonauts universe. Criticism was directed at the game's short length, limited replay value, and abrupt ending.

The game was nominated for "Best VR Experience" in IGN's Best of 2017 Awards, and for "Immersive Reality Game of the Year" at the 21st Annual D.I.C.E. Awards.

References

External links
Double Fine announcement

2017 video games
Adventure games
Double Fine games
PlayStation 4 games
PlayStation VR games
Psychonauts
Puzzle video games
Single-player video games
Video games about psychic powers
Video games developed in the United States
Windows games